The 1946 Southeastern Savages football team was an American football team that represented Southeastern Oklahoma State College as a member of the Oklahoma Collegiate Conference (OCC) during the 1946 college football season. In their third, non-consecutive season under head coach Dave Stephens, the team compiled a 9–3 record, won the OCC championship, and outscored opponents by a total of 193 to 92.

In the first four games of the season, the Savages did not allow a single point scored by their opponents. They tallied nine touchdowns in those games but failed to convert a single point after touchdown.

Stephens had coached Southeastern for two seasons before World War II. He served in the Merchant Marine during the war. Upon his return to the program, he compiled a 50-player squad which he operated out of the modified T formation that he had run in 1941. Several players from Stephens' pre-war teams returned to the 1946 team.

Four Southeastern players were selected by the Associated Press as first-team players on the 1946 All-Oklahoma Collegiate Conference team: Gene Jones at end; James Harris at guard; Lloyd "Red" Skelton at center; and Howard Guyer at quarterback. In addition, end Bill Caldwell and fullback Lee Allen were named to the second team. Tackle Bert Lana and guard Charles Hollingsworth were named to the third team.

The team played its home games at Paul Laird Field in Durant, Oklahoma.

Schedule

Roster

Starters
 Lee Allen, back, 190 pounds, Durant, Oklahoma
 Bill Caldwell, end, 195 pounds, Durant
 Mig Dinnard, guard, 180, Duncan
 Curtis Green, back, 170, Durant
 Howard Guyer, quarterback, 160, Durant
 James Harris, guard, 180 pounds, Duncan, Oklahoma
 Charles Hewitt, back
 Charles Hollingsworth, guard, 165 pounds, Duncan
 Gene Jones, end, 160 pounds, Durant
 Bert Lana, tackle, 190 pounds, Stilwell, Oklahoma
 Lloyd Skelton, center, 170 pounds, Fox, Oklahoma
 Ovid White, back, 165, Durant
 J.T. Williams, back, 176, Durant
 Aubrey Williamson, tackle, 195, Durant

Others
 Johnny Juett, back, 165, Durant
 Steve Hayes, center, 190, Wagoner
 Grady Tyndol, back, 165, Addington
 James Miller, guard, 190, Guthrie
 Tom Busby, end, 155, Caddo
 Bennett Freeny, back, 160, Caddo
 Paul Alley, guard, 190, Durant
 Don Ethridge, tackle, 225, Durant
 Jack Seabaugh, back, 165, Denison
 Charles Andrews, back, 175, Denison
 Marvin Harvey, tackle, 230, Orange, T.
 Sam Hunsaker, center, 170, Durant
 Jack Lucas, center, 185, Wetumka
 Bob Lemon, tackle, 240, Durant
 J. Van Meter, back, 160, Henryetta
 Don McDowell, end, 150, Henryetta
 H. Crowder, back, 195, Hartshorne
 B. Lovelace, end, 170, Hartshorne
 Nelson Turnbow, end, 182, Ryan
 Ben Earnest, end, 170, Phillips, T.
 Austin Earnest, end, 220, Oklahoma City
 Wayne Norwood, guard, 190, Idabel
 Elmer Butler, guard, 170, Ringling
 W.T. Thorne, back, 155, Sallisaw
 Gerald Sanders, back, 160, Tyler, T.
 Ray Drake, guard, 185,  Muskogee
 M. Holland, back, 160, Peru, Ind.
 Jim Barnett, back, 155, Muskogee
 Jimmy Hallett, tackle, 190, Duncan
 Louis Whitley, back, 170, Duncan
 Harold Corbett, end, 165, Vinita
 Kelly Ryan, center, 167, Vinita
 Bill Belcher, guard, 175, Vinita
 Louis Green, end, 170, Vinita
 Lowell Dunegan, back, 180, Wilson
 B. Tucker, back, 155, Mineral Wells
 Earnest Kennedy, back, 165, Shawnee
 Dick Allen, end, 170, Lawton
 Earl Pruitt, back, 145, Lawton
 John Bass, back, 1800, Healdton
 Garland Landers, back, 190, Durant
 Bill Redman, back, 165, Eufaula
 Richard Wiley, back, 155, Fox
 Paul Lamour, tackle, 190, Haileyville
 B. McMurtrey, back, 160, Haileyville
 J.C. Dunn, end, 190, Spiro
 Eddy Enloe, back, 160, Zaneis
 W.L. Hawkins, back, 150, Madill
 Lennial Rambo, guard, 165, Durant
 Morris Haynie, tackle, 230, Durant

References

Southeastern
Southeastern Oklahoma State Savage Storm football seasons
Southeastern Savages football